Guiar is one of six parishes in Vegadeo, a municipality within the province and autonomous community of Asturias, in northern Spain.

Villages
 Graña de Guiar
 Guiar

Parishes in Vegadeo